Strange Desire may refer to:

Film
Her Strange Desire alternative title of Potiphar's Wife, 1931 British romance film starring Nora Swinburne

Music

Albums
Strange Desire, a 2014 album by Bleachers
Strange Desire, album by Georg Kajanus and Tim Dry as Noir, 1995

Songs
"Strange Desire", rockabilly song by Jack Scott (singer)
"Strange Desire", song by INXS from Welcome to Wherever You Are, B-side of "Beautiful Girl" (INXS song)
"Strange Desire", song by Nacht und Nebel (band) 1983
"Strange Desire", song by The Black Keys from Magic Potion (album), B-side of "Your Touch"
"Strange Desire", song by Nicci Cable, in Mexican DJ group Polymarchs List of Polymarchs albums under Musart